Melvin Gaels GFC is a Gaelic Athletic Association gaelic football club in Kinlough, County Leitrim, Ireland.

The club was formed on 19 November 1954. Situated in North Leitrim it is bordered by three Counties: Donegal, Fermanagh and Sligo. The club is named after Lough Melvin, a fresh-water lake. 

The club is based in the village of Kinlough and draws its members from the parish of Kinlough/Glenade and part of the parish of Ballaghmeehan. Contained within the four areas are Tullaghan, Askill, Rossinver, Glenaniff and Ballintrillick.  Although Ballintrillick is in County Sligo, it is half the parish of Glenade and over the years it has provided many members for Melvin Gaels.

There are two adult Melvin Gaels teams. The senior team last won a Leitrim Senior Football Championship in 2012 and has won the senior title a total of seven times.  A reserve team was established in the mid-1990s and has won the Junior League three times (1999, 2003, 2011) and a Championship twice (2004, 2011) since its formation.

The club colours are blue and white on the request of the late Rev. J. Dolan P.P one of the founding members of the Club and native of County Cavan.

The 1962 Leitrim Senior Football Championship had been declared null and void, but in March 2009 Melvin Gaels were declared as champions, ending the longest-running dispute the GAA had ever had.

Players
Emlyn Mulligan

Honours

As of 8 Oct 2012.

References

External links
Melvin Gaels CLG Website
Melvin Gaels Facebook Page

Gaelic games clubs in County Leitrim
Gaelic football clubs in County Leitrim